This Side of Heaven is a 1934 American pre-Code drama film directed by William K. Howard, written by Zelda Sears, Eve Greene, Edgar Allan Woolf and Florence Ryerson, and starring Lionel Barrymore, Fay Bainter, Mae Clarke, Tom Brown and Una Merkel. It was released on February 2, 1934, by Metro-Goldwyn-Mayer.

Premise
Personal and professional problems eventually drive a man to attempt suicide.

Cast
Lionel Barrymore as Martin Turner
Fay Bainter as Francene Turner
Mae Clarke as Jane Turner
Tom Brown as Seth Turner
Una Merkel as Birdie
Mary Carlisle as Peggy Turner
Onslow Stevens as Walter
Henry Wadsworth as Hal
Edward Nugent as Vance
C. Henry Gordon  as William Barnes
Dickie Moore as Freddie
Edwin Maxwell as R.S. Sawyer
Mickey Daniels as Stinky Bliss
Helen Hayes as Actress on screen in theatre, Uncredited Cameo (Clip from Another Language)
Robert Montgomery as Actor on screen in theatre, Uncredited cameo (Clip from Another Language)

References

External links
 

1934 films
American drama films
1934 drama films
Metro-Goldwyn-Mayer films
Films directed by William K. Howard
American black-and-white films
Films with screenplays by Florence Ryerson
Films about suicide
Films with screenplays by Edgar Allan Woolf
1930s English-language films
1930s American films